William Arnot Ellis (16 September 1923 – 25 April 2015) was a Scottish first-class cricketer.

Ellis was born in September 1923 at Bo'ness, West Lothian. He was educated at Linlithgow Academy. A club cricketer for Carlton Cricket Club, Ellis made a single appearance in first-class cricket for Scotland against Ireland at Paisley in 1954. Batting once in the match, he was dismissed for 6 runs in the Scottish first innings by Godfrey Graham, with the match ending in a draw. Outside of cricket, Ellis was a finance clerk. He died in April 2015 at Larbert, Stirlingshire.

References

External links
 

1923 births
2015 deaths
People from Bo'ness
People educated at Linlithgow Academy
Scottish cricketers